The Second Oklahoma Legislature was a meeting of the legislative branch of the government of Oklahoma, composed of the Oklahoma Senate and the Oklahoma House of Representatives, during the only term of Governor Charles Haskell. State legislators elected in 1908 met in the Guthrie City Hall Building from January 5 to March 12, 1909. The state legislature also met in special session from January 20 to March 19, 1910.

Oklahoma's first black state legislator, A.C. Hamlin, was among the new group of state legislators, but was limited to one term by a Jim Crow law passed by the legislature.

Dates of sessions
Regular session: January 5-March 12, 1909
Special session: January 20-March 19, 1910
Previous: 1st Legislature • Next: 3rd Legislature

Major legislation
Legislation enacted on March 6, 1909, created the Southeastern Normal School, which would later become Southeastern Oklahoma State University. Initially offering four years of high school and junior college, the school opened its doors to students on June 14, 1909.

Party composition

Senate

House of Representatives

Leadership

Senate
Lieutenant Governor George W. Bellamy continued to serve as the first President of the Senate, which gave him a tie-breaking vote and allowed him to serve as a presiding officer. J. C. Graham was elected as the second President pro tempore of the Oklahoma Senate, giving him the authority to organize the state senate and serve as a presiding officer.

House
Ben Wilson served as the second Speaker of the Oklahoma House of Representatives. He hailed from a town known as Cereal, which today is known as Banner, Oklahoma. Benjamin F. Harrison, of Calvin, served as Speaker Pro Tempore.

Members

Senate

Table based on list cross-referenced from three sources.

House of Representatives

Table based on government database.

References

External links
Second State of the State
Third State of the State
Oklahoma Legislature
Oklahoma House of Representatives
Oklahoma Senate

Oklahoma legislative sessions
1909 in Oklahoma
1910 in Oklahoma
1909 U.S. legislative sessions
1910 U.S. legislative sessions